Rachitis may refer to:

 Rickets
 Răchitiş (disambiguation), two villages in Romania